Samaira Sandhu is an Indian film actress. She is best known for her films Dhayam, Bharateeyans and "Umran Ch Ki Rakheya".

Film career 
In 2017, Samaira started her film career from Tamil film Dhayam, which was directed by Kannan Rangaswamy.

In 2022, Samaira worked in Deena Raj's directorial Bharateeyans. The film is funded by a US based doctor Shankar Naidu Adusumilli. The teaser was launched by Vivek Agnihotri.

Samaira is associated with Fit India Movement and brand ambassador of two NGOs, Chandigarh Round Table (CRT) and Handicapped Children and Women Association (HCWA).

In 2022, she worked with Neel Bhattacharya in a short film which is based on autism. In the same year she has acted alongside Krushal Ahuja in a music album sung by Javed Ali.

Filmography
Dhayam (2017)
Damayanthi (2021)
Umran Ch Ki Rakheya (2022)
Bharateeyans (2022)
Aliya (2022) opposite to Neel Bhattacharya

Music videos

Bibliography 
Samaira Sandhu wrote a book Heaven in a Hell which is based on drug addiction. It was published in 2016.

References

External links
 
 Samaira Sandhu Actress Portfolio
 Samaira Sandhu Official Website
 Samaira Sandhu on Waah Kya Baat Hai Season 2 Episode 11

Indian film actresses
People from Punjab, India
People from Chandigarh
Year of birth missing (living people)
Living people
21st-century Indian actresses